Battle of Pleichfeld, in 1086, was the last major battle of the Great Saxon Revolt (1077–1088), a nobles' rebellion against the emperor Henry IV in the Holy Roman Empire. The battle was a victory for the rebel forces.

Prelude 
In their rebellion against the central imperial authority, Herman of Luxembourg and Duke Welf I of Bavaria laid siege to the imperial city of Würzburg in summer of 1086. In an effort to destroy the center of rebellion and to maintain the unity of the empire, emperor Henry IV attempted to lift the siege.

Battle 
Imperial army, numbering about 20,000 (according to unverifiable contemporary accounts), was largely composed of armed peasants and town militia, while rebel forces, numbering some 10,000, had a larger proportion of mounted knights.

Rebel knights dismounted, and charged the enemy on foot. Loyalist army, composed mostly of untrained peasants and armed citizens, broke and fled after the first charge. Their swift defeat was attributed by chroniclers to treason amongst the emperor's own knights, who accepted a bribery and changed sides in the thick of battle.

References 

Pleichfeld
Pleichfeld
Pleichfeld
1086 in Europe
Pleichfeld
Great Saxon Revolt